The economy of Gujarat, a state in Western India, has significant agricultural as well as industrial production within India. Major agricultural produce of the state includes cotton, groundnuts (peanuts), dates, sugar cane, milk and milk products. Gujarat recorded the lowest unemployment rate in India in 2015, with 1.2% of the labour force being unemployed.

Gujarat is ranked number one in the pharmaceutical industry in India, with a 33% share in drug manufacturing and 28% share in drug exports. The state has 130 USFDA certified drug manufacturing facilities. Ahmedabad and Vadodara are considered as pharmaceutical hubs as there are many big and small pharma companies established in these cities.

Gujarat has the longest coastline in India, and its ports (both private and public sector) handle around 40% of India's ocean cargo, with Mundra Port located in Gulf of Kutch being the largest port of India by cargo handled (144 million tons) due to its favorable location on the westernmost part of India and closeness to global shipping lanes.
Gujarat also contributes around 20% share in India's industrial production and merchandise exports.

Contribution 
The world's largest ship breaking yard is in Gujarat near Bhavnagar at Alang.

Reliance Petroleum, one of the group companies of Reliance Industries Limited founded by Dhirubhai Ambani operates the oil refinery at Jamnagar which is the world's largest grass roots refinery. The company has also planned another SEZ (special economic zone), in Jamnagar.

Legatum Institute's Global Prosperity Index 2012 recognised Gujarat as the highest-scoring among all States of India on matters of social capital.

Data

Sectors

Industrial
One of India's most industrialized states, Gujarat maintains a variety of industries, the principal ones being general and electrical engineering and the manufacture of textiles, vegetable oils, chemicals, soda ash, and cement. New industries include the production of fertilizers and petrochemicals. Major resources produced by the state include cotton, peanuts, dates, sugarcane, and petrol. The state is rich in calcite, gypsum, manganese, lignite, bauxite, limestone, agate, feldspar and quartz sand and successful mining of these minerals is done in their specified areas. Gujarat produces about 91% of India's required amount of soda ash and gives the country about 66% of its national requirement of salt. Chemical Industries in Gujarat count for more than 35% of Indian Chemicals production.

In recent years, Gujarat has gained a prominent place in India's automobile industry, with several automobile plants being set up in the state - Suzuki Motor Gujarat in Hansalpur near Ahmedabad, Tata Motors and Ford India in Sanand, MG Motor, Hero Motocorp, JCB in Halol, Honda Motors and Scooters India in Vithalapur, etc.

It is one of India's most prosperous states, having a per-capita GDP significantly above India's average. Kalol Khambat and Ankleshwar are today known for their oil and natural gas production. Dhuvaran has a thermal power station, which uses coal, oil and gas. The Tarapur nuclear station in Maharashtra supplies the remaining power. Also on the Gulf of Khambat, 50 kilometers southeast of Bhavnagar, is the Alang Ship Recycling Yard (the world's largest). General Motors produces the ‘Astra’ car at Halol near Vadodara. Jalalpur is a large town of Gujarat, where several small and large textile industrial units have been established. Surat, a city by the Gulf of Khambat, is a hub of the global diamond trade.

During the period 1960–1990, Gujarat established itself as a leader in various industrial sectors including textiles, engineering, chemicals, petrochemicals, drugs and pharmaceuticals, dairy, cement and ceramics, and gems and jewellery. The post-liberalization period saw Gujarat's state domestic product (SDP) rising at an average growth rate of 14% per annum in real terms (from 1994 to 2002).

Ahmedabad, Vadodara, Ankleshwar and Vapi are the hub of chemical industries in the state, having number of manufacturing units (private as well as state owned) manufacturing dyes, specialty chemicals, agricultural chemicals, pesticides, pigments, colors, etc. Rajkot city is the hub of engineering manufacturing and has many companies manufacturing auto components, auto engines, CNC machines, forging & casting parts, etc. The state operating companies like GNFC, GSPC, GSFC, GMDC are a few among flagship companies of the state.

Agriculture
Gujarat is the largest producer of major cash crop like cotton, groundnut, tobacco, cumin, sesamum, etc. in India. Other major crops produced are rice, wheat, jowar, bajra, maize, tur and gram. Gujarat has an agricultural economy the total crop area amounts to more than one-half of the total land area.

Animal husbandry and dairying have played a vital role in the rural economy of Gujarat. Dairy farming, primarily concerned with milk production, functions on a cooperative basis and has more than a million members. Gujarat is the largest processor of milk in India. Amul milk co-operative federation products are well known all over India and is Asia's biggest dairy. Among livestock raised are buffalo and other cattle, sheep, and goats. As per the results of livestock census 1997, there were 209.70 lakh livestock in Gujarat state. As per the estimates of the survey of major livestock products, during the year 2002–03 the Gujarat produced 6.09 million tonnes of milk, 385 million eggs and 2.71 million kg of wool. Gujarat also contributes inputs to industries like textiles, oil and soap.

Automobile

Gujarat has been witnessing increasing investment both from Indian and foreign companies in recent times on account of its pro-business policies and this has augmented well for the engineering industry in Gujarat, which contributes to about 10% of the country’s total engineering output. The automotive sector
in Gujarat is still at a relatively nascent stage, and contributes to about 5% of the country’s total automotive output.important players in the region include Asia Motor Works, Atul Auto, Munjal Auto India Ltd. and Electrotherm. Rajkot district is the largest cluster for the production of auto components and diesel engines in the state. Gujarat has offered several incentives to Suzuki Motors to set up an export-oriented unit for production and export of its popular models including the  A-Star. The state would assist the company in setting up railway links from its production unit to Mundra Port.

After Tata Motors relocated the Nano manufacturing plant to Sanand, a small town near Ahmedabad, Gujarat has emerged as a car manufacturing hub. Major multinational automobile companies like Suzuki Motor, Ford India, Honda, MG Motor and Hero MotoCorp have plants in operation in Gujarat. Gujarat also leads in upcoming hybrid and electric vehicle manufacturing facilities. Suzuki, in partnership with Denso and Toshiba, is building a lithium ion battery manufacturing facility at a cost of 1700 crore. Suzuki is planning to launch electric cars as well as electric bikes by 2020. The India-based JSW Group has signed an agreement to invest Rs 4000 crore to promote manufacturing electric vehicles in the state, which includes vehicle manufacturing, production of batteries, and storage solutions. MG Motors, a subsidiary of China's largest automobile company SAIC Motors, has bought General Motors' manufacturing facility in Halol, Gujarat, and is planning to start production by 2019. Tata Motors is also planning to produce electric cars from its Sanand plant.

Banking and finance
Gujarat has one of the best banking networks in the country and the banking business in the state is well supported by the thriving trade, commerce and industries.

The country’s first international financial services centre (IFSC) at Gujarat International Finance-Tec City (GIFT City) in Gandhinagar, when American multinational IBM inaugurated the IBM Software Labs at GIFT-IFSC. Conceptualized a decade and half ago as an IFSC, the pace of growth, participation and investment at GIFT City has seen unprecedented growth in the past three years.
Institutions such as Bank of America,Standard Chartered Bank, Hongkong & Shanghai Bank Corporation Ltd, Citibank NA, Barclays Bank, Deutsche Bank, and JPMorgan Chase Bank National Association have set up IFSC Banking Units (IBUs) in GIFT city,Gujarat.By January 2021, the total banking transactions already reached $51 billion at GIFT IFSC. With GIFT City offering opportunities to foreign banks to book India-linked offshore businesses, more players are setting foot in Gujarat.

The following are the list of Banks based in Gujarat.

Pharmaceuticals and Chemicals
Gujarat is ranked number one in the pharmaceutical industry in India, with a 33% share in drug manufacturing and 28% share in drug exports. The state has 130 USFDA certified drug manufacturing facilities. Ahmedabad and Vadodara are considered as pharmaceutical hubs as there are many big and small pharma companies established in these cities.

Oil and Gas 
Gujarat is India's 'Oil Capital'. Gujarat accounts for 54% of India's onshore crude oil and 39% of onshore natural gas production. It accounts for approximately 46% of India's installed refining capacity and 60% of India's total crude oil import facilities. The government has announced his US$4.5 billion prospectus and his US$5.7 billion investment in Gujarat. Gujarat has a well-developed gas network of 550 km and with an investment worth US$500 million he plans to expand it to 2,200 km. Investments have been proposed and are underway to build new LNG terminals, in addition to the existing terminals at Dahej and Hazira. The state offers great opportunities across the energy value chain. Progressive and investor-friendly industrial policies, including tax rationalization, energy reforms and the development of special economic zones, coupled with logistical proximity to Middle East gas resources, are one of the key growth drivers for the sector.

The presence of cooperatives such as IIFCO, KRIBHCO, energy companies such as NTPC and GEB, and large industrial companies such as Reliance have created a vibrant energy sector in Gujarat. The Jamnagar refinery is India's largest in terms of refining capacity and is also considered the largest grassroots refinery in the world.Gujarat has oil & gas reserves located at Ankleshwar, Mehsana, Tapti High,Hazira, Bharuch, Gandhar, Dahej, Jambussar, Palej, Kalol and isolated gas fields around Ahmadabad. In addition to this, it has discovered oil reserves in Dholka and Khambat.

Foundry
India has about 5000 foundries and is the fourth largest producer of castings in the world, with an annual output of over 7.5 million tons. Indian foundries regularly meet the demands and expectations of the global market and currently export about 300,000 tons annually. Many Indian foundries have adopted the state-of-the-art technology, in all areas of manufacturing.India has a stable domestic demand, which has helped the foundries survive the recent global economic downturn.India remains a high growth region for small cars, tractors and two wheelers. The annual production of cars and SUVs is already above one million mark. The industrial growth has been impressive at 5-6 %, in spite of the recessionary trends.

Of the many foundry centres in India, Gujarat has two leading clusters – Ahmedabad and Rajkot, each producing more than 40,000 tons/year. Ahmedabad has a number of small and medium size foundries, producing a variety of castings in Grey Iron, S.G. Iron, Steel and also Aluminum alloys. Rajkot engineering cluster produces a range of products such as castings, pump-sets, automobile components, diesel engine generating sets, bearings, machine tools and so on. In addition, a number of miscellaneous engineering items such as agricultural implements, hydraulic jacks, air compressors, fasteners and sobon are also manufactured in the cluster.The presence of Rajkot Engineering cluster in different engineering segments.

Foreign Trade 
In fiscal year 2021-22, Gujarat's merchandise exports hit a record level of over 12,700 Crore INR (nearly $127 Billion) a highest in the country. The major merchandise exports from Gujarat during the year 2021 were:

7 of top 12 Export Districts of India are in Gujarat; Jamnagar and Surat leading the list 
Regular compilation of district-wise export data has been started from April 2021. India’s top 30 districts of exports along with top 5 exported commodities during the period April–September 2021-22 and the products/services identified with export potential are given below:

This information was given by the Minister of State in the Ministry of Commerce and Industry, Smt. Anupriya Patel, in a written reply in the Rajya Sabha.

State government revenue and spending

Article 246 of the Indian Constitution, distributes legislative powers including taxation, between the Parliament of India and the State Legislature.

The constitution does not have provision for the central government and the States to have concurrent power of taxation. The tables below lists the thirteen taxes to be levied by the Central government and  nineteen taxes by States including Gujarat.

Central government of India

State governments

Goods and Services Tax 
The tax came into effect from 1 July 2017 through the implementation of the One Hundred and First Amendment of the Constitution of India by the Indian government. The GST replaced existing multiple taxes levied by the central and state governments.
It an indirect tax (or consumption tax) used on the supply of goods and services. It is a comprehensive, multistage, destination-based tax: comprehensive because it has subsumed almost all the indirect taxes except a few state taxes. Multi-staged as it is, the GST is imposed at every step in the production process, but is meant to be refunded to all parties in the various stages of production other than the final consumer and as a destination-based tax, it is collected from point of consumption and not point of origin like previous taxes.

Economy of regions

Energy 
Energy is an essential building block in the economic development of Gujarat . In an effort to meet the demands of rapid industrialization, the energy sector of Gujarat has undergone significant growth in past few years. Areas like resource exploration, capacity additions and sectoral reforms have been revolutionized. The energy sector can be categorized primarily in to Power, Oil & Gas respectively. The power sector includes generation, transmission and distribution of electricity. The power sector has grown considerably over the years and is able to support infrastructure development in the state. As far as oil & gas sector is concerned, the state has major contribution in areas of exploration & production, LNG terminal infrastructure, pipeline networks, refining, petro marketing and city gas distribution.

Electricity 
Electricity generation for the state of Gujarat is handled by the Gujarat State Electricity Corporation Limited. The major distributors of electricity in Gujarat are Uttar Gujarat Vij Company Ltd., Dakshin Gujarat Vij Company Ltd., Paschim Gujarat Vij Company Ltd. and Madhya Gujarat Vij Company Ltd.. These institutions are subsidiaries of Guvnl with the transmission of electricity of handled by Gujarat Energy Transmission Corporation Limited.

Installed Capacity 
The total installed capacity of Gujarat is 42208 MegaWatt (MW). Most of the electricity in Gujarat is generated through coal. Hydropower is the second largest means of producing electricity in the state. Gujarat also has significant installed capacities of Natural Gas, Renewables and Nuclear power plants. As of 2021-22, the share of electricity generated through coal stands at 16302 MW with a percentage share of 40 percent. The share of Hydropower is at 41 percentage with a capacity of 16588 MW. The contribution of Natural gas stands at 16 percent with a capacity of 6587 MW. The installed capacity of Renewable energy is 2 percent with a capacity of 772 MW. Finally, 559 MW is capacitated by Nuclear Power having a share of 1 percentage.

Renewable Energy 
As of March 31, 2022 the installed capacity of Renewable Energy sources of Gujarat is 13578 MW. The installed capacity of Wind energy stands at 6662 MW, Solar energy has an installed capacity of 6717 MW and other Renewable sources stand at 199 MW.

The locations of major solar parks in Gujarat have been mentioned in Solar power in Gujarat page.

Nuclear Energy 
Currently, the state of Gujarat has an installed  Nuclear Power capacity of 559 MW. The only Nuclear power plant in Gujarat is the Kakrapar Atomic Power Station.

The two existing units at the Kakrapar atomic power station feature pressurised heavy water reactors (PHWR) of 220MW capacity each. As of May 2020, unit one of the Kakrapar atomic power station generated 30,683 million units of electricity while unit two produced 32,442 million units

Tourism

India's first world heritage city, Ahemdabad, is in Gujarat. It is one of the most popular states in the country, with an annual footfall of 19.81 million tourists in 2010–11. Gujarat offers scenic beauty from Great Rann of Kutch to the hills of Saputara. It is the world's sole home of pure Asiatic lions.

During the Sultanate reign, Hindu craftsmanship mixed with Islamic architecture, giving rise to the Indo-Saracenic style. Many structures in the state are built in this fashion.

It is also the birthplace of Mahatma Gandhi and Sardar Vallabhbhai Patel, the great iconic figures of India's Independence movement.

Amitabh Bachchan is currently the brand ambassador of Gujarat Tourism. The ‘Khushboo Gujarat Ki' campaign by  Amitabh Bachchan has grown tourism in Gujarat by 14 per cent, twice the national growth rate.

The Statue of Unity has emerged as a major tourist destination in Gujarat. It attracted average 15,036 visitors in the month of November, 2019.

Notes

References

External links
Gujarat 2050 map showing major development areas